The 2007 Formula BMW ADAC season was a multi-event motor racing championship for open wheel, formula racing cars held across Europe. The championship featured drivers competing in 1.2 litre Formula BMW single seat race cars. The 2007 season was the tenth and the last Formula BMW ADAC season organized by BMW Motorsport and ADAC before it was merged with Formula BMW UK series into Formula BMW Europe in 2008. The season began at Motorsport Arena Oschersleben on 5 May and finished at the Hockenheimring on 14 October, after eighteen races.

Jens Klingmann was crowned series champion.

Driver lineup

2007 Schedule

Results

Championship standings

Drivers' standings
Points are awarded as follows:

† — Drivers did not finish the race, but were classified as they completed over 90% of the race distance.

Teams' standings

References

External links
 Formula BMW ADAC 2007 on adac-motorsport.de

Formula BMW seasons
Formula BMW ADAC
BMW ADAC